S. was the Archdeacon of Lewes from 1207 until 1226.

References

Archdeacons of Lewes
13th-century English clergy